John Brian Aldred  (August 1921 – 15 December 2020) was an English sound engineer. He was nominated for two Academy Awards in the category Sound Recording. He worked on 57 different films and TV shows from 1942 to 1973. He retired in 1986.

Aldred died in Worthing, West Sussex in December 2020 at the age of 99.

Selected filmography
 Anne of the Thousand Days (1969)
 Mary, Queen of Scots (1971)

References

External links

100 years of cinema loudspeakers, written by Aldred

1921 births
2020 deaths
English audio engineers
People from Doncaster